Ruan van Rensburg (born 31 May 1993 in Pretoria, South Africa) is a South African rugby union player who plays for the SWD Eagles in South Africa's Provincial Competition the Currie Cup. His regular position is scrum-half.

Career

Golden Lions

Van Rensburg attended Hoërskool Waterkloof in Pretoria, where he played first team rugby in 2010 and 2011. After school, he moved to Johannesburg to join the  Academy, where he made a single appearance for the s during the 2012 Under-19 Provincial Championship.

The Golden Lions finished in fourth spot on the log to qualify for the semi-finals, where they lost 41–44 after extra time to eventual champions .

At the start of 2014, Van Rensburg was included in the  squad for the 2014 Vodacom Cup competition.

He was a key player for the s in the 2014 Under-21 Provincial Championship, starting twelve of their thirteen matches. He shared the kicking duties with Hanco Deale and Brandan Hewitt for the Golden Lions, and ended the second with the second-highest personal points contribution from a Lions player behind Deale; he scored 59 points, which consisted of 25 conversions and 3 penalties.

Wits & Leopards

He started the season representing  in the 2015 Varsity Shield competition.

Free State Cheetahs

He moved to Bloemfontein prior to the 2015 Currie Cup Premier Division and was named on the bench for their third match of the competition against .

Notes

References

South African rugby union players
Living people
1993 births
Rugby union players from Pretoria
Rugby union scrum-halves
Free State Cheetahs players
Golden Lions players
Leopards (rugby union) players
Southern Kings players
Cheetahs (rugby union) players
Eastern Province Elephants players
SWD Eagles players